The Vancouver Athletic Club football team (the Wolves) was a Canadian football that played in the British Columbia Rugby Football Union and the Western Canada Rugby Football Union from 1929 to 1936. The team was part of the popular and successful Vancouver Athletic Club, which fielded teams in several other sports.

The Vancouver Athletic Club were a very successful team, winning 3 championships in 8 seasons.

Vancouver Knights of Columbus football team
No sooner had the Vancouver Athletic Club team disbanded, than a couple days later the Knights of Columbus football team was founded, with most of their players. While the players were very much the same, the team was supported by the venerable service organization and was a distinctively separate club. Unfortunately, the KoC team did not enjoy any of the previous success, and ceased play after three seasons, from 1937 to 1939.

-

BCRFU season-by-season

References

Defunct Canadian football teams
Canadian football teams in Vancouver